Jean-Antoine-Marie "Antonin" Idrac (1849–1884) was a French sculptor.

A pupil of Falguière, his works include:

Salammbô / Eve and the Serpent, based on the novel Salammbô
Cupid Stung
Mercury inventing the Caduceus, now in the Musée d'Orsay
Étienne Marcel, an equestrian statue in Paris.

His work has been cited as an influence on the sculpture of Lord Leighton.

External links

French language
Idrac at Insecula
Idrac at RMN

English language
Eve statuette at Leicester Galleries, with biography
Salammbo statue exhibited at World Columbian Exposition 1893

1849 births
1884 deaths
Prix de Rome for sculpture
Burials at Père Lachaise Cemetery
19th-century French sculptors
French male sculptors
19th-century French male artists